The Oz Academy Openweight Championship is a women's professional wrestling championship owned by the Oz Academy promotion. The reigning champion is referred to as the "Wizard of Oz". The championship, which is situated at the top of Oz Academy's championship hierarchy, was introduced on March 10, 2007, when Aja Kong defeated Chikayo Nagashima in the finals of a tournament to become the inaugural champion.

Like most professional wrestling championships, the title is won as a result of a scripted match. There have been twenty-six reigns shared among seventeen different wrestlers.

Reigns 
Aja Kong was the first champion in the title's history. She also holds the records for most reigns, with three. Akino holds the record for the longest reign, at 537 days, achieved on her first reign. Mio Shirai's only reign of four hours and two minutes is the shortest in the title's history. Overall, there have been twenty-eight reigns shared among seventeen different wrestlers. Akino is the current champion in her third reign.

Title history

Combined reigns 

References

External links 
 Oz Academy's official website
 OZ Academy Openweight Championship history at Wrestling-Titles.com

Oz Academy championships
Openweight wrestling championships
Women's professional wrestling championships